Appledore railway station was a railway station in north Devon, situated close to the village of Appledore, a community lying on the peninsula formed by the sea (Barnstaple Bay), the River Torridge, and the River Taw.

History 
The station was, from 1 May 1908, the terminus of a line running some 7½ miles from Bideford. This line had until 1901 run only as far as Northam. Mr Harold Robert Moody was the station master. The station closed on 28 March 1917 when the locomotives were taken away for use in World War 1.

Infrastructure

Appledore had a 300-ft long, one-foot high platform, situated on the down side of the line. Brick built public toilets, a general and ladies waiting rooms and ticket office were provided, similar in appearance to those built at Westward Ho!. Two railway cottages were built at the site. The station had gas lighting and was unique for the line in having a footbridge; this allowed access from Irsha Street to nearby allotments.

A run-round loop was provided, together with a dead-end siding, engine shed, water tower, hydrant, and coal store. The signal cabin, situated on the platform, had ten levers and the station was controlled by up, down, and distant signals. An example of the unusual B,WH&AR single post buffer stop was at the end of the siding.

Micro history
A terracotta memorial entitled 'Appledore station', on a background of locomotive wheels and gearing, produced by ceramic artist Maggie Curtis, commemorates the old station.

The trackbed from Appledore to Richmond Road Halt was converted into a road in 1935 and the station buildings were demolished apart from the back wall.

See also

 Northam station
 Westward Ho! station

References 
Notes

Sources
Baxter, Julia & Jonathan (1980). The Bideford, Westward Ho! and Appledore railway 1901–1917. Pub. Chard. .
Garner, Rod (2008). The Bideford, Westward Ho! & Appledore Railway. Pub. Kestrel Railway Books. .
Jenkins, Stanley C. (1993). The Bideford, Westward Ho! and Appledore Railway. Oxford : Oakwood Press. .
Stuckey, Douglas (1962). The Bideford, Westward Ho! and Appledore Railway 1901–1917. Pub. West Country Publications.

External links
 

Disused railway stations in Devon
Former Bideford, Westward Ho! and Appledore Railway stations
Railway stations in Great Britain opened in 1908
Railway stations in Great Britain closed in 1917
1908 establishments in England
Torridge District